Ian Geoffrey Swallow (born 18 December 1962, Barnsley, Yorkshire, England) was an English first-class cricketer, who appeared for Yorkshire County Cricket Club from 1983 to 1989, and for Somerset in 1990 and 1991.

Swallow was a right-arm off break bowler and a right-handed batsman. In 88 first-class matches he scored 1,550 runs at 20.39, with his single century being a score of 114.  He took 106 wickets, with a best of 7 for 95, at an average of 54.69. He is considered to be the greatest of all time at Elsecar CC where he retired from cricket last season.

References

External links
Cricinfo Profile

1962 births
Living people
English cricketers
Yorkshire cricketers
Somerset cricketers
Cricketers from Barnsley
English cricketers of 1969 to 2000